Pakistan had a national team compete in the fifth Asian Netball Championship held in Colombo in 2001.

The Pakistan Netball Federation (PNF) is the national governing body of Netball in Pakistan

References

Bibliography

External links 
Olympic Council of Asia